Waddan Airport  is an airport serving the town of Waddan in the Jufra District of Libya.

See also

Transport in Libya
List of airports in Libya

References

External links
 OpenStreetMap - Waddan
 OurAirports - Waddan Airport
 FallingRain - Waddan Airport
 Google Earth

Airports in Libya